Game Over is the second extended play by British rapper Dave. It was released on 3 November 2017 independently for streaming and digital download. The EP includes 7 tracks with production from Fraser T Smith, 169 and Steel Banglez, alongside a guest appearance from MoStack. It succeeds Dave's debut EP, Six Paths (2016).

Game Over debuted at number thirteen on the UK Albums Chart. The EP was supported by two singles: "Question Time" and "No Words" featuring MoStack, the latter of which peaked at number 17 on the UK Singles Chart.

Background
On 9 October 2017, Dave announced his second extended play, Game Over, alongside the announcement of its accompanying tour.

Promotion
Throughout 2017, Dave released numerous non-album singles that preceded the release of Game Over – "Samantha" featuring J Hus on 27 January 2017, "Revenge" on 4 April 2017, "100M's" on 26 May 2017 and "Tequila" on 14 July 2017.

The lead single, "Question Time" was released on 9 October 2017 alongside its music video and the pre-order for the EP. The politically-charged song comments on Brexit, the Grenfell Tower disaster and NHS budget cuts.

A day before the EP's release, the music video for the second single "No Words" featuring MoStack was uploaded to YouTube.

Track listing

Notes
  signifies an additional producer.
  signifies a co-producer.

Charts

Certifications

References

2017 EPs
Dave (rapper) EPs
Albums produced by Dave (rapper)
Albums produced by Fraser T. Smith
Albums produced by Steel Banglez